Martin Loeb may refer to:

 Martin Löb (1921–2006), German mathematician
 Martin P. Loeb, professor of accounting and information assurance